The Tamil Nadu Cricket Association (TNCA) is the governing body of cricket activities in the Indian state of Tamil Nadu. It is affiliated woth the Board of Control for Cricket in India and governs the Tamil Nadu cricket team. Rupa Gurunath, a daughter of N Srinivasan, is the former president of the Tamil Nadu Cricket Association. The TNCA is one of the permanent test centres of the BCCI.

History 
The board was formed when organized league cricket in the state began in Madras in 1932. It was formed after two rival bodies — the Indian Cricket Federation and the Madras Cricket Club — merged, becoming the Madras Cricket Association (MCA).

The MCA was formally constituted on April 30, 1935, shortly thereafter affiliating with the Board of Control for Cricket in India. The Cricket Association was to control representative cricket in the province.

By 1933-34, the association had first and second division leagues, with a third division added on the next season. By 1939-40, it had added a fourth division.

In 1967-68 season, the M.C.A. was renamed as Tamil Nadu Cricket Association (TNCA). As of 2008, it had five divisions with a total of 132 teams.

Division leagues
The Tamil Nadu Cricket Association conducts various league tournaments,  tournaments for the age groups of U19, U22, and U25 categories besides organizing and conducting National Tournaments. It also conducts league championship for city affiliated clubs.

There are 726 league matches played every year from first division to fifth division. A zone consisting of 12 teams each plays in the first and second divisions, whereas third, fourth, and fifth division consists of two, three, and four zones respectively. The city league format in the first division where league matches are played on a three-day duration follows the Ranji Trophy guidelines.

Home ground
M A Chidambaram Stadium or Chepauk Stadium located in Chennai is the home ground. The stadium was established in 1916 and it is the oldest continuously used cricket stadium in the country. It is named after M A Chidambaram, former President of BCCI, the stadium was formerly known as Madras Cricket Club Ground.

It is the home ground of the Tamil Nadu cricket team and the Indian Premier League team Chennai Super Kings. The stadium is located at Chepauk, a few hundred meters from Marina beach along the Bay of Bengal.

Recent National Players from TNCA

 Dinesh Karthik - Wicket Keeper Batsman in the Indian cricket team
 Murali Vijay -  Former Opening batsman in the Indian cricket team.
 Ravichandran Ashwin - Off-Spin Bowler in the Indian cricket team.
 T. Natarajan - Fast bowler in the Indian cricket team.
 Washington Sundar - All rounder in the Indian cricket team
 Abhinav Mukund - Former Batsman in the Indian cricket team.
 Vijay Shankar - All rounder in the Indian cricket team.
Varun Chakravarthy - Spin bowler in the Indian cricket team.

Premier league

TNCA inaugurated its regional Twenty20 league Tamil Nadu Premier League in August, 2016. The inaugural edition featured eight teams, playing a total of 31 matches (28 league matches, two semi-finals and the final). Chennai, Dindigul (Natham) and Tirunelveli were the venues. Two new venues in Coimbatore and Salem were added in 2020. Albert Tuti Patriots won the inaugural edition beating Chepauk Super Gillies by 122 runs.

See also 

 M. A. Chidambaram Stadium
 Tamil Nadu cricket team
Salem Cricket Foundation stadium ( SCF Stadium )

References

External links 

 Official TNCA website
M. A. Chidambaram Stadium page on BCCI website

Cricket administration in India
Cricket in Tamil Nadu
Sports organizations established in 1932
1932 establishments in India